John R. Wooden High School is a public continuation high school  in the Reseda neighborhood of the San Fernando Valley, Los Angeles, California, within the Los Angeles Unified School District.

History
Aliso High School was renamed John R. Wooden High School in 2004, in honor of UCLA basketball coach John Wooden.

References

External links
 Official Website

Los Angeles Unified School District schools
High schools in the San Fernando Valley
High schools in Los Angeles
Public high schools in California
Reseda, Los Angeles